The 2003 Nigerian Senate election in Osun State was held on April 12, 2003, to elect members of the Nigerian Senate to represent Osun State. Felix Kola Ogunwale representing Osun Central, Akinlabi Olasunkanmi representing Osun West and Iyiola Omisore representing Osun East all won on the platform of the Peoples Democratic Party.

Overview

Summary

Results

Osun Central 
The election was won by Felix Kola Ogunwale of the Peoples Democratic Party.

Osun West 
The election was won by Akinlabi Olasunkanmi of the Peoples Democratic Party.

Osun East 
The election was won by Iyiola Omisore of the Peoples Democratic Party.

References 

April 2003 events in Nigeria
Osun State Senate elections
Osu